Mediodactylus aspratilis, also known as the Iranian gecko or Iranian keel-scaled gecko, is a species of lizard in the family Gekkonidae. It is endemic to southwestern Iran.

References

Mediodactylus
Reptiles described in 1973
Geckos of Iran
Endemic fauna of Iran